In geometry, the augmented truncated dodecahedron is one of the Johnson solids. As its name suggests, it is created by attaching a pentagonal cupola onto one decagonal face of a truncated dodecahedron.

External links
 

Johnson solids